Egmont Key National Wildlife Refuge and State Park is a National Wildlife Refuge and State Park located on the island of Egmont Key, at the mouth of Tampa Bay. Egmont Key lies southwest of Fort De Soto Park and can only be reached by boat or ferry. Located within Egmont Key National Wildlife Refuge and State Park are the 1858 Egmont Key Lighthouse, maintained by the U.S. Coast Guard, and the ruins of Fort Dade, a Spanish–American War era fort that housed 300 residents. Egmont Key is located in Hillsborough County Florida on a narrow strip of the county that extends along the Tampa Port Shipping Channel.

Egmont Key National Wildlife Refuge was established in 1974. The entire  island is all part of the Refuge. Egmont Key is one of the three 'Tampa Bay Refuges', along with Passage Key National Wildlife Refuge, and the Pinellas National Wildlife Refuge, that was administered as a part of the Chassahowitzka National Wildlife Refuge Complex but changed to the Crystal River National Wildlife Refuge Complex headquartered in Crystal River, Florida. The complex also manages the Crystal River National Wildlife Refuge and the Chassahowitzka National Wildlife Refuge.

U.S. Fish and Wildlife Service owns and manages Egmont Key National Wildlife Refuge and entered into a cooperative agreement with Florida Park Service to cooperatively manage the entire island in 1989 and is known as Egmont Key National Wildlife Refuge and State Park.

Registry information 
Egmont Key was listed as a Military related place of significance in the National Register of Historic Places on December 11, 1978 with reference #78000946. Only 2.75 miles North West from Egmont Key is the Historic Register #100003048 U.S.S. NARCISSUS Tugboat Shipwreck that can be toured.

Fauna
Among the wildlife in the refuge are box turtles, gopher tortoises, dolphins, manatees, and birds such as osprey, brown pelicans, white ibis, royal and sandwich terns, black skimmers, American oystercatchers and laughing gulls.  The southern end of Egmont Key and a section of the east beach are closed year-round to all public use to provide nesting habitat for the laughing gulls, terns, white ibis, brown pelicans, and American oystercatchers.  These closed areas also provide habitat for birds migrating during the spring and fall and for wintering birds.

Visiting 
There are no refuge or state park fees for visiting the island (this is excluding ferry tickets or boat rental fees).

Egmont Key is only accessible by boat and has no drinking water, restrooms, or shops due to the remote nature. Because of this, visitors are advised to bring food and water for their visit. No alcoholic beverages, glass, kites, drones, fireworks, hunting, or pets of any kind are permitted on the island due to the island being a National Wildlife Refuge.

Visitors needing transport to the island can utilize the Egmont Key Ferry Cruise provided by Hubbard's Marina departing from the Bay Pier located within Fort De Soto. The ferry departs daily at 10am and 11am for a 4 hour trip; 3 hours on the island and 30 minutes travel each way. On Tuesday, Thursday, Saturday, and Sunday there is also a 2pm ferry. Ferry tickets are $30.00 for adults 12 and up, $15.00 for youth ages 3–11, and free for those under age 3. Snorkeling gear can also be rented.

GPS coordinates include:

 Ranger Station: N 27 36. 032 W 82 45. 623
 Lighthouse: N 27 36. 047 W 82 45. 634
 Fort Dade: 27.5953° N, 82.7637° W

Recreational activities
Activities include sunbathing, swimming, shelling (shell collecting - collecting of live shells is prohibited), boating, picnicking, snorkeling, and wildlife viewing within designated areas. Visitors can also tour the fort ruins and gun batteries. The lighthouse is no longer open to the public due to safety concerns.  A visitor center, staffed by volunteers, is located in the guardhouse and is open on special occasions. Amenities include beaches, nature trails, and picnic tables.

Hours
Egmont Key is open 365 days a year from 8am until sunset.

History
Egmont key was surveyed by Spanish explorers in 1757. In 1761, the English named the island Egmont Key for the Earl of Egmont. As with the rest of Florida, Egmont Key transitioned between rule by Spain and England multiple times before finally becoming part United States in 1827. In 1847, concerns with hazardous navigation at the mouth of Tampa Bay led to the construction of the first lighthouse, but the Great Gale of 1848 swamped the island and all but destroyed the original lighthouse. The lighthouse keeper reportedly rode out the storm in a rowboat tied to a palmetto. After the storm had passed, the keeper rowed to Fort Brooke and tendered his resignation. In 1858, the lighthouse was replaced with the lighthouse that still stands today.

During the 19th century, Egmont Key was used as a camp for captured Seminoles at the end of the Third Seminole War and later in the century the island was occupied by the Union Navy during the American Civil War. Defense considerations during the Spanish–American War led to the construction of Fort Dade on the island in 1898, and Egmont Key remained a military reservation until 1923.

In 1928, Pan Am's first crash occurred in the Gulf of Mexico near Egmont. On August 15th that year, a Fokker/Atlantic F.VIIIb/3m that was turned into a "C-2 Tri-motor", General Machado (NC55 or 53), was operating a Pan Am flight from Havana to Key West, when it became lost and ditched off of the island after running out of fuel. 1 of the 5 occupants, Norman Ageton, died. The plane had been originally built as a F.VIIIb/3m for Colonial Air Transport. 

In 1974, the U.S. Fish and Wildlife Service took over Egmont Key. They turned the island over to the State of Florida in 1989, and it became a state park. Budgetary concerns in 2009 led to a proposal to close the park.

Harbor pilot station
Since 1926, Egmont Key has been the location of the Tampa Bay Pilot Association's Pilot Station operation guiding ship traffic safely into and out of the port of Tampa, protecting the wildlife and environment from damage.

Gallery

Notes

References
 Egmont Key State Park at Florida State Parks
 Egmont Key State Park at Absolutely Florida
 Egmont Key National Wildlife Refuge at U.S. Fish and Wildlife Service
 Hillsborough County listings at Register of Historic Places
 Hillsborough County listings at Florida's Office of Cultural and Historical Programs

External links

 Egmont Key Alliance website
 An island of history: Egmont Key

State parks of Florida
National Register of Historic Places in Hillsborough County, Florida
National Wildlife Refuges in Florida
Protected areas established in 1974
Tourist attractions in the Tampa Bay area
1974 establishments in Florida
Tampa Bay
National Register of Historic Places in Florida